The Prisoner of Shark Island is a 1936 American drama film loosely based on the life of Maryland physician Samuel Mudd, who treated the injured presidential assassin John Wilkes Booth and later spent time in prison after his controversial conviction for being one of Booth's accomplices. The film was produced by Darryl F. Zanuck, was directed by John Ford and starred Warner Baxter and Gloria Stuart.

Twentieth Century Pictures, before it merged with Fox, purchased the rights to the book The Life of Dr. Mudd by Nettie Mudd Monroe, the doctor's daughter. The film's credits, however, make no reference to Monroe or her book. Modern sources state that Darryl F. Zanuck, Twentieth Century's vice-president in charge of production, got the idea to make the film after he read an article in Time magazine about the prison camp for political prisoners on the Dry Tortugas island.

Plot
A few hours after the assassination of President Abraham Lincoln (Frank McGlynn Sr.), Dr. Samuel Mudd (Warner Baxter) gives treatment to a man with a broken leg who shows up at his door. Mudd does not know that the president has been assassinated, and also does not know the man he is treating is Lincoln's assassin, John Wilkes Booth. Mudd splints the broken leg and receives a banknote as payment, only later realizing that it is a $50 bill.

Mudd is soon afterward arrested for being an accessory in the assassination, is convicted, and is then sent to Arcadia, a prison on the Dry Tortugas that is referred to in the film as "America's own Devil's Island".

Mudd's wife hatches an escape plan using "Buck", the black prison guard who tends to Mudd. Mudd escapes his cell, hears Sgt. Rankin's instruction to kill him on sight, and gets to the prison's outer wall above the shark-infested moat before an alarm is sounded. Mudd then swims to a waiting boat where his wife and her father (Mr. Holt) help him. However, Sgt. Rankin boards the boat, recaptures Mudd and returns him to the prison, where he is confined to a windowless, underground cell.

The island has been in the grip of a yellow fever epidemic, with the official prison doctor having fallen ill with the same fever. The Commandant has few options and places Mudd in charge of addressing the outbreak. Now with the cooperation of the soldier guards, Mudd introduces ventilation into the hospital ward (mainly by smashing the windows). The yellow fever epidemic subsides and Mudd ironically saves the life of Sgt. Rankin, but not before Mudd also catches the fever. The soldiers sign a petition to have Mudd pardoned and he is ultimately released.

Cast

 Warner Baxter as Dr. Samuel Alexander Mudd
 Gloria Stuart as Mrs. Peggy Mudd
 Claude Gillingwater as Col. Jeremiah Milford Dyer
 Arthur Byron as Mr. Erickson
 O.P. Heggie as Dr. MacIntyre
 Harry Carey as Commandant of Fort Jefferson
 Francis Ford as Cpl. O'Toole
 John McGuire as Lt. Lovett
 Francis McDonald as John Wilkes Booth
 Douglas Wood as Gen. Ewing
 John Carradine as Sgt. Rankin
 Joyce Kay as Martha Mudd
 Fred Kohler Jr. as Sgt. Cooper
 Ernest Whitman as 'Buck' Milford
 Paul Fix as David Herold
 Frank Shannon as Joseph Holt
 Frank McGlynn Sr. as President Abraham Lincoln
 Leila McIntyre as Mary Todd Lincoln 
 Etta McDaniel as Aunt Rosabelle Milford 
 J.M. Kerrigan as Judge Maiben 
 Arthur Loft as Frank J. Thomas - Carpetbagger 
 Paul McVey as Gen. David Hunter 
 Maurice Murphy as Prison Hospital Orderly 
 Jack Pennick as Corporal (uncredited) 
 Robert Homans as Sergeant (uncredited) 
 Murdock MacQuarrie as Edman Spangler (uncredited)
 Cyril Thorton as Michael O'Laughlen (uncredited)
 Cecil Weston as Mary Surratt (uncredited) 
 Lloyd Whitlock as Henry Rathbone (uncredited)

Critical response
A contemporary review by Frank Nugent in The New York Times reported that the film presents Mudd's story "with commendable directness," noting "Warner Baxter's entirely convincing portrayal of Dr. Mudd" but also claiming that the film "is scarcely more than a well-fabricated edition of the Dreyfus-Devil's Island series that has become part of the screen's tradition." Variety reported that "Warner Baxter [...] turns in a capital performance as the titular prisoner of ‘America’s Devil’s Island’", and described the casting as "tiptop", with "John Carradine stand[ing] out as a new face among especially sinister heavies." Writing in Turner Classic Movies, critic Jeremy Arnold described the film as a "highly entertaining, fast-moving film with endlessly fascinating subject matter," being "one of director John Ford's less-talked-about pictures" and noting that "John Carradine [...] is deliciously evil and nasty in one of the most memorable performances of his career [and] Warner Baxter as Mudd gives perhaps THE best performance of his own career."

References

Further reading
  A reconsideration of the film in the context of the 2012 film Lincoln.

External links
 
 
 
 Dr. Mudd Research Site
 The Prisoner of Shark Island at Virtual History
 1938 Lux Radio Theater broadcast of The Prisoner of Shark Island

1936 films
1936 drama films
1930s prison films
20th Century Fox films
American black-and-white films
American Civil War films
American prison drama films
Assassination of Abraham Lincoln
American docudrama films
1930s English-language films
Fictional depictions of Abraham Lincoln in film
Films directed by John Ford
Films produced by Darryl F. Zanuck
Films set in Florida
Films set in the 1860s
Films set on islands
Films with screenplays by Nunnally Johnson
Cultural depictions of John Wilkes Booth
1930s historical films
American historical films
1930s American films